Okunevo is a rural locality (a settlement) in Bauntovsky District, Republic of Buryatia, Russia. The population was 6 as of 2010. There are 4 streets.

Geography 
Okunevo is located by lake Kapylyushi, in the Tsipikan river valley, 113 km northwest of Bagdarin (the district's administrative centre) by road.

References 

Rural localities in Bauntovsky District